Kona Pacific Public Charter School is a public charter school located in Kealakekua, Hawaii. Founded in 2008, the school serves students in kindergarten through Grade 8.

History
Kona Pacific Public Charter School was established by an act of the Charter School Review Panel in July 2008 and opened its doors to students that Fall. Kona Pacific serves a student body that is representative of the diversity of the South Kona community that it serves. 

Each year, Kona Pacific provides educational services to 230 students, as well as important supplemental social services to more than 100 school families. 

Kona Pacific’s 98% historical enrollment clearly demonstrate the school’s success at providing academic and learning support services to the community. These enrollment figures would be considered outstanding for any school, but are extraordinary for a period that includes the founding year, with subsequent annual growth of at least 25%. Throughout that time, student retention averaged 88%, also an extremely high figure in a state with a very transient population and resultant student attrition. This is also an indicator of the high level of parent satisfaction with the school.

In its first 9 years of operation, Kona Pacific has also become a state pioneer in the field of school and community nutrition. In Fall 2012, Hawaii Island’s nutrition program vendor ceased operations with just 30 days notice. As the only federally approved food service vendor for nutrition programs in West Hawai‘i, their closure endangered the health and well-being of 450 impoverished citizens, mostly young children and elders. Kona Pacific immediately responded to this emergency need by developing their W.H.O.L.E. Foodservice program in time to ensure that no at-risk residents went hungry. The school also operates Hawaii's only mobile Summer Lunch Program, providing daily meals for vulnerable island children for whom hunger doesn't take a summer break. Since the program's launch in June 2015, Kona Pacific has served more than 22,000 lunches to at-risk children at 10 sites throughout West Hawaii.

In 2019 the entire board resigned in May amid allegations that the school had been over paying for rent of its facilities and had been too heavily influenced in its operations by the facility owner.

Campus
The Kona Pacific campus is located on  surrounded by fields and forests. The campus is a beautiful, safe open space for children to learn and play.

Curriculum
Kona Pacific Public Charter School offers a comprehensive education that weaves together three strands:
 A holistic, hands-on, project based Waldorf education, promoting student achievement in language arts, math, science, visual arts, foreign languages, musical training and movement;
 An educational program that embraces the values of Hawaiian culture, with particular focus on environmental education and community sustainability through understanding and respect for the people, land and sea of Hawai'i; and
 A curriculum rich in the life-sustaining practices of farming and gardening that are a vital part of Hawai‘i Island life.

Extracurricular activities

References

External links
 Kona Pacific Public Charter School

Charter schools in Hawaii
Educational institutions established in 2008
Schools in Hawaii County, Hawaii
Middle schools in Hawaii County, Hawaii
Public elementary schools in Hawaii
Public middle schools in Hawaii
Public K–8 schools in the United States
2008 establishments in Hawaii